Nicaragua earthquake may refer to:

1931 Nicaragua earthquake
1972 Nicaragua earthquake
1992 Nicaragua earthquake

See also
List of earthquakes in Nicaragua